Sorin Socol (born 30 November 1977 in Bucharest) is a Romanian retired rugby union player who played as a lock.

He has won 61 caps for Romania. After being voted player of the tournament in the 1996 Under 21 Rugby World Championships where he captained Romania, Socol has played club rugby in France. He moved to France just prior to the tournament and studied business while playing for Brive. He played for Brive's top squad for seven years between 1996 and 2003.

Socol made his international debut for Romania against Spain on 18 February 2001. At the beginning of the 2003/2004 season he moved to Agen where he played in the Top 14 and Heineken Cup. He captained Romania for the first time on 30 October 2003 during the 2003 World Cup match against Namibia. After leaving Agen in 2007 he played for Pau in France's Pro D2 for the 2007/2008 season. He also captained Romania in the 2007 World Cup finals.

References

External links

 

1977 births
Living people
Rugby union players from Bucharest
Romanian rugby union players
CA Brive players
SU Agen Lot-et-Garonne players
Section Paloise players
Rugby union locks
Romania international rugby union players
Romanian expatriate rugby union players
Expatriate rugby union players in France
Romanian expatriate sportspeople in France